Walter Werginz (18 February 1913 – 21 March 1944) was an Austrian football (soccer) player who competed in the 1936 Summer Olympics. He was part of the Austrian team, which won the silver medal in the football tournament. He played all four matches as forward and scored two goals.

He was killed in action during World War II, when serving under command of Nazi Germany on the Russian Front in the Ukraine in March 1944 aged 31.

References

External links
profile

1913 births
1944 deaths
Austrian footballers
Footballers at the 1936 Summer Olympics
Olympic footballers of Austria
Olympic silver medalists for Austria
Austria international footballers
Olympic medalists in football
Medalists at the 1936 Summer Olympics
Association football forwards
Austrian military personnel killed in World War II